
Mount Victoria, is a mountain on the border between British Columbia and Alberta in the Canadian Rockies. It is located just northeast of Lake O'Hara in Yoho National Park and is also part of Banff National Park and is on the Continental Divide (which is the definition of the interprovincial boundary in this region).

The mountain is located on the western buttress of Abbot Pass while Mount Lefroy lies on the eastern side.

The mountain was named by J. Norman Collie in 1897 for Queen Victoria.

The first successful ascent was made in 1897 by J. Norman Collie, Arthur Michael, Charles Fay, and Peter Sarbach.

Geology
Mount Victoria is composed of sedimentary rock laid down during the Cambrian period. Formed in shallow seas, this sedimentary rock was pushed east and over the top of younger rock during the Laramide orogeny.

Climate
Based on the Köppen climate classification, Mount Victoria is located in a subarctic climate zone with cold, snowy winters, and mild summers. Winter temperatures can drop below −20 °C with wind chill factors below −30 °C.

References

External links 

 Mount Victoria weather: Mountain Forecast
 Parks Canada web site: Banff National Park

Gallery

Three-thousanders of Alberta
Three-thousanders of British Columbia
Mountains of Banff National Park
Great Divide of North America
Canadian Rockies
Borders of Alberta
Borders of British Columbia